Liang Hong (simplified Chinese: 梁鸿; born 1973) is a contemporary Chinese author and academic.

Biography

Literary career
A native of Henan Province, Liang grew up in the Liang Village  which would become the subject of her acclaimed work China in One Village (Chinese title: 中国在梁庄) (2010), which was followed up by Leaving Liang Village (Chinese title: 出梁庄记) in 2013, and Liang Village Ten Years On (Chinese title: 神圣家族) in 2021. An English translated version: China in One Village: The Story of One Town and the Changing World, translated by Emily Goedde, was published in 2021. The books focus on how rural parts of China have been left behind by the country in the past few decades as it experienced seismic economic growth. More recently, she has published two novels, The Light of Liang Guangzheng (Chinese title: 梁光正的光) and Four Forms. In December 2021, her short stories collection, The Sacred Clan, translated by Esther Tyldesley, won the PEN Translates award.

Academic career
After completing her bachelor's degree, Liang studied at Zhengzou University, receiving her Master of Arts degree in 2000. In 2003, she received her PhD from Beijing Normal University. Liang now is a professor in literature at Renmin University, Beijing; specialising in scholarly research on twentieth century Chinese literature. She was previously a visiting scholar at Duke University in Durham, North Carolina. Her academic works include: Yellow Flower Moss and Soap Horn Trees, Construction of New Enlightenment Discourse, Notes of Foreign Affairs, The Disappearance of "Spiritual Light", "Homestalgia" as a Method and her academic essay collection History and My Moments.

Notable works

Novels (Chinese)
 中国在梁庄 [China in One Village] (2010)
 出梁庄记 [English: Leaving Liang Village] (2013) 
 神圣家族 [English: The Holy Family] (2015) 
 梁光正的光 [English: The Light of Liang Guangzheng] (2017) 
 梁庄十年 [Liang Village Ten Years On] (2021)

Translated works (English)
 China in one Village: The Story of One Town and the Changing World (2021)

Upcoming works
 The Sacred Clan

References

Living people
1973 births
Chinese academics
Chinese fiction writers
People from Henan